Parade College is an independent Catholic secondary school for boys, located across two campuses in the northern suburbs of Melbourne, Victoria, Australia; one at Bundoora; the other,  away, at Preston. The school was founded by the Congregation of Christian Brothers in January 1871 and is a member of Edmund Rice Education Australia.

History 
The school was founded by four Christian Brothers in January 1871. They had taught for two years in a small school behind St Francis’ Church in Lonsdale Street before moving into the bluestone building in Victoria Parade, East Melbourne. The school's official name was CBC East Melbourne but it was generally known as Parade College. About one hundred boys enrolled on the first day and this number grew steadily over the years. This building was affectionately known as the "Old Bluestone Pile" and the school song takes its name from this building.

Eventually in 1953 it became necessary to move the junior classes to a site newly acquired by the Old Paradians Association at Alphington. The old school premises in East Melbourne were taken over by Cathedral College (this school closed in 1995). In 1988, the junior classes at Alphington were moved to Bundoora and all three campuses occupied the spacious grounds large enough to give each campus its own recreational areas. In 2009 Parade opened a second campus in Preston. This had formerly been a long-established school, Marist College Preston which had been renamed Redden College before becoming Samaritan Catholic College. This new campus of Parade Years offers 7–9 classes as well as the Year 10 Edmund Rice Pathways Program and Year 11 VCAL studies.

Current status 
The college has almost 2000 students in Years 7–12 across both the Bundoora and the Preston campuses. The four houses of the school are named after the founding Brothers: Treacy (Yellow), Hughes (Blue), Bodkin (Red) and Lynch (Green). The school is a member of the Associated Catholic Colleges. Its "old boy" association is the Old Paradians. The school's sporting colours are purple, green and blue, which also feature in the lyrics of the school war-cry.

Sport 
Parade College is a founding member of the Associated Catholic Colleges (ACC).

ACC premierships 
Parade College has won the following ACC premierships.

 Athletics (17) - 1912, 1913, 1926, 1928, 1930, 1931, 1939, 1955, 1956, 1972, 1992, 2015, 2017, 2018, 2019, 2021
 Basketball (14) - 1979, 1980, 1985, 1986, 1987, 1988, 1989, 1990, 1993, 1994, 1995, 1997, 1998, 2000
 Cricket (15) - 1946, 1947, 1948, 1953, 1955, 1960, 1963, 1970, 1973, 1978, 1980, 1981, 1983, 1984, 1986
 Cricket T20 (3) - 2019, 2020, 2021
 Cross Country (4) - 1982, 1990, 1991, 1992
 Football (25) - 1938, 1940, 1941, 1946, 1948, 1954, 1955, 1957, 1958, 1962, 1964, 1967, 1976, 1980, 1981, 1984, 1985, 1986, 1987, 1989, 1995, 1997, 1998, 1999, 2009
 Handball (9) - 1934, 1935, 1936, 1938, 1940, 1941, 1946, 1951, 1952
 Hockey (3) - 2003, 2004, 2010
 Soccer (3) - 1994, 2001, 2002
 Swimming (12) - 1936, 1938, 1962, 1963, 1964, 1965, 1966, 1973, 1985, 1992, 1994, 1997
 Tennis (16) - 1953, 1954, 1955, 1980, 1982, 1983, 1984, 1989, 1990, 1991, 1992, 1993, 1994, 1995, 1996, 2020

Facilities

Bundoora campus
The Bundoora campus accommodates approximately 1,600 students in years 7-12 with VCE, VET, VCAL. Outdoor sporting facilities include three football / cricket ovals, two soccer pitches (of which two are synthetic), and athletics track, six tennis courts, two hockey fields and cricket nets. Indoor sporting facilities include the College Hall (which is an indoor sporting facility) that contains Moore Hall (with two basketball courts with seating for approximately 2,000 spectators), The Atrium (with one basketball court, table-tennis tables, and badminton nets), a canteen and change rooms and showers. The Greening Auditorium is an examination hall with two multi-purpose rooms, and on-site fitness centre, and change rooms and showers. Alphington Court is a multipurpose sports area.

The Edmund Rice Complex comprises classrooms, senior science labs, and a canteen for senior students. The Mt Sion Complex comprises classrooms, a drama room, two art rooms, two science labs, a dedicated VCE study centre, a careers centre, and three multi-purpose rooms. The Waterford Building comprises classroom, two science labs for junior students, and a music department with two classrooms and recording studios. The Yarangabee Centre comprises two food technology kitchens (one industrial and one standard), and a canteen for junior students. The Monagle Technology Centre comprises facilities for woodwork, metalwork, and robotics. The Edmund Rice Trade Training Centre comprises facilities for bricklaying, carpentry, building and construction, and scaffolding. The Rivergum Theatre has seating for approximately 350 patrons with full theatre lighting and sound systems, two dressing rooms (with mirrors, sinks, toilets and showers), and a canteen. The Nash Learning Centre is a multi-level library and resource centre with two recording studios, a reading pit, and an innovation lab (or maker space). Other facilities include the Ambrose Treacy Sport Pavilion, the Nolan Court amphitheatre, and a quadrangle.

Preston campus
The Preston campus accommodates approximately 300 students in years 8-9 and VCAL. Its facilities include soccer and cricket oval, six tennis courts, two basketball courts, the Penola Theatre, the Mackillop Centre (a multipurpose hall), the Callan Building that comprises science labs and woodwork / metalwork rooms, the Kilkenny Building that comprises classrooms, VCAL facilities, and a canteen, the Rice Building that comprises classrooms, the Caroline Chisholm Learning Centre, Arundel Place which is a plumbing centre, and the quadrangle.

Notable alumni 

 General John Stuart Baker Australian army general; Chief of the Australian Defence Force 1995-1998; and Director of the Defence Intelligence Organisation 1990-92
 Peter BedfordAustralian rules football player
 Brad BoydAustralian rules football player
 Sir Bernard Callinan   Commanding Officer, 20th Australian Infantry Battalion, the Pacific
 Blake CaracellaAustralian rules football player
 Peter CavenAustralian rules football player
 Vice-Admiral Sir John Augustine Collins Captain, HMAS Sydney; Commodore, HMA China Fleet
 Trent CotchinAustralian rules football player

 Adam DaleAustralian cricket player
 Walter De Backersinger and musician - Gotye
 Richard Di NataleFormer leader of the Australian Greens and Senator for Victoria
 Ricky DysonAustralian rules football player
 Jade GreshamAustralian rules football player
 Daniel HarfordAustralian rules football player
 Gary Honeysilver medallist, long jump, 1984 Los Angeles Olympiad, dual Commonwealth Games Gold Medallist
 Nathan HrovatAustralian rules football player
 Ben JohnsonAustralian rules football player
 Terry KeaysAustralian rules football player
 Gavan McCormackAsian languages and affairs academic
 Major General Jim Molan Australian Defence College, 1st Division, 1st Brigade, 6th Battalion, Royal Australian Regiment
 Jarrod MolloyAustralian rules football player
 Terry Moran Secretary of the Department of Prime Minister and Cabinet
 Massimo Murdoccaassociation football player
 Michael Kenneth Pratt recipient for bravery and Australia's only living George Cross medal recipient
 Andrew Robb former Howard Government Minister
 Sergio SilvagniAustralian rules football player
 Tony SneazwellAustralian high-jumper, 1964 Tokyo Olympiad, 1968 Mexico Olympiad
 John Wegner German-born opera singer

References

External links
 Parade College, Bundoora
 Old Paradians

Catholic secondary schools in Melbourne
Congregation of Christian Brothers secondary schools in Australia
Associated Catholic Colleges
Educational institutions established in 1871
1871 establishments in Australia
Buildings and structures in the City of Banyule